KVKI-FM (96.5 MHz) is a radio station broadcasting an adult contemporary music format. Licensed to Shreveport, Louisiana, United States, the station serves the Shreveport area. The station is currently owned by Townsquare Media. Its studios are shared with its other five sister stations in West Shreveport (one mile west of Shreveport Regional Airport), and the transmitter is in Blanchard, Louisiana. The call letters were originally KBCL-FM, and later became religious station KEPT, before the call letters were changed to KVKI to be similar to the call letters of the popular KVIL radio station in Dallas, Texas.

References

External links

Radio stations in Louisiana
Mainstream adult contemporary radio stations in the United States
Townsquare Media radio stations
Radio stations established in 1959
1959 establishments in Louisiana